Franco Niell (born May 22, 1983 in Trelew, Chubut) is an Argentine football striker.

Career

Niell is of Scottish descent. Niell joined the Argentinos Juniors youth system in 2001, and debuted professionally on April 12, 2004. In his first match he came on as a substitute for Gustavo Oberman, and scored a goal in the 3–1 victory over Colón de Santa Fe.

On January 22, 2008, he signed on loan with D.C. United. His first appearance for United was against Harbour View FC in the 2008 CONCACAF Champions Cup.  On June 26, 2008 he was waived by D.C. United.

On July 12, 2009, coming from the bench in the 18 m. of the ST, he scored arguably two of the most important goals of his career when he scored 2 goals with his team Gimnasia La Plata in the last minutes of the game (44 & 46 ST), goals that allowed Gimnasia to remain in the first division of the Argentinian League. Gimmnasia was playing with 9 men and needed 2 goals to keep the category against Atlético de Rafaela, team that did beat them 3–0 in the first match. The two goals were headers.

In 2009 Niell was loaned to Deportivo Quito of Ecuador, and in 2011 he was loaned back to Querétaro F.C. of Mexico.

References

External links
  
 Guardian statistics
 

1983 births
Living people
People from Trelew
Argentine footballers
Association football forwards
Argentinos Juniors footballers
Argentine people of Scottish descent
D.C. United players
Club de Gimnasia y Esgrima La Plata footballers
S.D. Quito footballers
Querétaro F.C. footballers
Guillermo Brown de Puerto Madryn footballers
Figueirense FC players
Rosario Central footballers
Quilmes Atlético Club footballers
Barracas Central players
Argentine Primera División players
Major League Soccer players
Ecuadorian Serie A players
Liga MX players
Argentine expatriate footballers
Argentine expatriate sportspeople in Brazil
Argentine expatriate sportspeople in Mexico
Argentine expatriate sportspeople in Ecuador
Argentine expatriate sportspeople in the United States
Expatriate footballers in Brazil
Expatriate footballers in Mexico
Expatriate footballers in Ecuador
Expatriate soccer players in the United States